Gaeboo Achyok or Gyalpo Ajok was a Lepcha chieftain of a principality based at Damsang, presently in the Kalimpong district of West Bengal, India.

Achyok faced active threats from an expansionist Bhutan and formed an alliance with Tibet under the Fifth Dalai Lama to fend his territories. Several wars were fought against the Bhutanese, until he was eventually captured at Daling and executed.

Name 
Achyok's Lepcha name is generally transliterated as áchúk. The formal Tibetan spelling of his name  is pronounced variously as "Achuk", "Achok", "Achog" and "Ajok". The spelling Amchok is also found in Tibetan and Bhutanese sources. Other variations of his name include Zhelngo Achok etc.

Honorific 
The Tibetans refer to him as a Gyalpo, meaning "king". The Bhutanese call him a Monpa (low-lander) and regard him as their rebel-subject. Lepchas honor him with Gyebú, translating to "great".

Historical context 
The Himalayan region consisting of the present day Sikkim, Chumbi Valley and western Bhutan was largely a frontier territory since early seventeenth century. Not held by any major power, its primary inhabitants were Indian tribes, Lepchas and Bhutias. 

In the early 17th century, Tibetans had started to immigrate and settle in the region due to a variety of causes including sectarian persecution. Soon, the Sikkimese royal house of Chogyals would be founded in 1642, in Western Sikkim, ostensibly as an alliance between Lepchas and these immigrants. Around the same time, the Bhutanese state was getting unified under the leadership of Ngawang Namgyal and would enter into a state of war with an expansionist Tibet — a war was already fought in late 1650s, which the Tibetans lost comprehensively.

Biography

Rise to power 

C. 1634, Kunchok Gyaltshan (var. Könchok Gyeltsen, Dkon-mchog-rgyal-mtshan), a Tibetan monk of the Barawa sect was exiled from Bhutan along with his followers for not supporting the Namgyal regime. He went on to settle in Damsang — a strategic location on a ridge overlooking the Rhenock valley and the Jelep La route to Tibet. He constructed several small monasteries in and around the region. He is said to have received all necessary approvals from the Chogyals.

Bhutan's religio-military assault kept on the rise with chronicles recording a dispatch of forces to nearby Dagana in 1650, to subdue recalcitrant monpas — this might have affected Damsang as well. Despite these hurdles, including what he notes to be an increased presence of Bhutanese monks, Kunchok Gyaltshan managed to hold significant commanding in the local population. In 1660, he chose to return to his home monastery (in Tibet) for a vacation.   

By the time he returned around 1663, more Lamas from Bhutan had encroached on his territories and a local Lepcha chieftain, Gaeebo Achyok, had assumed control. Gyaltshan did not resist thse encroachments and ventured northwards. This is the first mention of Gaeebo Achyok in the contemporary sources. The extent of his sovereignty at this stage remains uncertain.

Conflict with the Bhutanese 
Soon after these developments, the Bhutanese lamas began to exert pressure on the Lepchas, aided by their regional fortress at Daling, which was probably an old Lepcha fort usurped by the Bhutanese in the conflict of 1650s. In late 1668 Gaeboo Achyok went to Lhasa to seek assistance from the 5th Dalai Lama, and had an audience with him; Bhutanese expansions had triggered a separate conflict with the Tibetans on multiple fronts and he expected a favorable response. Two months later, Tibet sent multiple columns of army to invade Bhutan in support of Achyok as well as a certain Nyingma lama of Merak.

The invasion was not successful for Tibet (as well as Achyok, by extension) and the troops were withdrawn. An armistice was called by the lamas of Tashilhunpo and other monasteries. In the post-war negotiations, both Tibet and Bhutan claimed Achyok's territory as theirs. Finally, a peace treaty was signed in 1669 — status-quo was to be observed till 1675.

Death 
Early in 1675, Gaeboo Achyok informed the Tibetans that the Bhutanese were secretly preparing for an all-out offensive against him before the expiry of the peace treaty. While routine border incursions were commonplace, this was an unprecedented development and the Dalai Lama ordered a preemptive attack, which was carried out, burning a frontier outpost at Tendung (var. Steng gdung rdzong).
Protracted diplomatic negotiations including on the status of Achyok's territory followed at Phari (var. Phag Ri), with Bhutan claiming all rights to Achyok's territory. By the ninth month of 1675, Dalai Lama had unwillingly conceded to Bhutan's hardball tactics but stopped all border-trade with Bhutan.

Faced with local rebellions, the Bhutanese armies had already launched military operations under the commandership of Mgron-gnyer Rdor-legs-pa and Phyag-mdzod-pa A'u Drung but initially, they proved to be little effective; Achyok had even managed to capture the frontier outpost of Daling. Rituals were held in Punakha and by the third month of 1676, the fort was taken back and territories annexed — Gaeboo Achyok was captured and executed. His head and arms were reportedly paraded in public after being staked in a pole. Gyalsey Tenzin Rabgye even composed a poem of compassion, deeming Achyok to have committed great evil.

Aftermath 
With a new regent at helm of affairs in Tibet, Bhutan's capture of Achyok's territories was not favorably received. War preparations were initiated, and months later, Tibet would mount the largest ever invasion of Bhutan with eleven columns of army aiming to besiege them from all sides. Tibet fared better than previous attempts but were yet again warded off. 

Finally, in 1679, another peace deal was agreed upon and the frontiers settled. Tibetan records mention nothing about this conflict or the deal. However, the massive expansion of Gelugpa Monastery came soon, in what has been since interpreted as a deterrent to Bhutanese expansionism.

Political heir
Contrary to popular memory, Gaeboo Achyok was not the last Lepcha "King". A successor to Achyok had emerged by 1680, called "Monpa Adzin" in Bhutanese records. He seems to have not taken any side in the Tibeto–Bhutanese conflict but played off the two sides to unknown results. He partook in the negotiations over land rights in lower Chumbi Valley with the representatives of Tibet and Bhutan. The Bhutanese claim that he took their side in the negotiations, which concluded after over two years in 1687.

By 1690, Bhutanese frontier-men, if not the state, seem to have recovered Damsang for they had erected border cairns.

Legacy 
Achyok remains a hero to the Lepchas and his birthday on 20 December is commemorated. In April 2018, both Daling Fort and Damsang Fort were enlisted as heritage sites by West Bengal Heritage Commission.

Notes

References

Bibliography 
 
 
 Reprinted in

External links 

 Location of the Damsang Fort Ruins, GMaps, retrieved 29 September 2021  - according to Ardussi (2011), p. 40.

 The ancient fort ruins of Damsang and Dalim- Destination for heritage tourism in Kalimpong, CultureScroll.com, 4 September 2020.

Lepcha people